Frank Faylen (born Charles Francis Ruf, December 8, 1905 – August 2, 1985) was an American film and television actor. Largely a bit player and character actor, he occasionally played more fleshed-out supporting roles during his forty-two year acting career, during which he appeared in some 223 film and television productions, often without credit.

Career
Born in St. Louis, Missouri, Faylen began his acting career as an infant appearing with his vaudeville-performing parents on stage. The family lived on a showboat, and performed throughout his youth.

Faylen became a stage actor at 18 and eventually began working in films in the 1930s. He began playing a number of bit parts for Warner Bros., then freelanced for other studios in gradually larger character roles. He appeared as Walt Disney's musical conductor in The Reluctant Dragon, and as a stern railroad official in the Laurel and Hardy comedy A-Haunting We Will Go. Faylen and Laurel and Hardy supporting player Charlie Hall were teamed briefly by Monogram Pictures.

Faylen's breakthrough came in 1945, where he was cast as Bim, the cynical nurse at Bellevue's alcoholic ward in The Lost Weekend. In the following year, he played Ernie Bishop, the friendly taxi driver in Frank Capra's 1946 film It's a Wonderful Life. Faylen's career also stretched to television, where he appeared in a number of western series, such as Maverick and Zane Grey Theater, as well as playing series regular long-suffering grocer Herbert T. Gillis, the father of the title character on the 1950s-'60s television sitcom The Many Loves of Dobie Gillis. He also played Bert Hollinger in the ABC comedy That Girl.

In 1968, he had a small part in the Barbra Streisand film Funny Girl. Faylen appeared in almost 200 films.

He has a star at 6201 Hollywood Boulevard in the Television section of the Hollywood Walk of Fame. It was dedicated on February 8, 1960.

Personal life
Faylen was married to Carol Hughes, an actress. Their two daughters, Catherine and Carol, are retired actresses. Catherine "Kay" Faylen was Regis Philbin's first wife. 

Faylen died from pneumonia in Burbank, California, in 1985. He was interred in the San Fernando Mission Cemetery in Mission Hills, Los Angeles, California.

Selected filmography

 Road Gang (1936) as Police Radio Dispatcher (uncredited)
 The Sky Parade (1936) as Pilot (uncredited)
 Border Flight (1936) as Jimmie
 Bullets or Ballots (1936) as Gatley - Pinball Racketeer (uncredited)
 China Clipper (1936) as Weatherman (uncredited)
 Down the Stretch (1936) as Ben - Bookie (uncredited)
 All American Chump (1936) as Reporter (uncredited)
 King of Hockey (1936) as Swede, Nick's Associate
 Night Waitress (1936) as Policeman at Torre's (uncredited)
 Gold Diggers of 1937 (1936) as Man Shaving on Train (uncredited)
 Smart Blonde (1937) as Ambulance Driver (uncredited)
 Midnight Court (1937) as Reporter (uncredited)
 Marked Woman (1937) as 2nd Cabbie (uncredited)
 The Cherokee Strip (1937) as Henchman Joe Brady
 The Go Getter (1937) as Country Club Man #2 (uncredited)
 San Quentin (1937) as Convict Envying Hoffman (uncredited)
 Kid Galahad (1937) as Barney
 The Case of the Stuttering Bishop (1937) as Charlie Downs
 Ever Since Eve (1937) as Bandit Leader at Monteray Tavern (uncredited)
 Dance Charlie Dance (1937) as Ted Parks
 Public Wedding (1937) as Trainman (scenes deleted)
 They Won't Forget (1937) as Reporter
 Talent Scout (1937) as Master of Ceremonies (scenes deleted)
 That Certain Woman (1937) as Reporter (uncredited)
 Wine, Women and Horses (1937) as Horse Buyer (uncredited)
 Back in Circulation (1937) as James Maxwell - a Reporter (uncredited)
 Headin' East (1937) as Joe
 The Invisible Menace (1938) as Private of the Guard
 No Time to Marry (1938) as Waxler
 Four's a Crowd (1938) as Taxi Driver (uncredited)
 Too Hot to Handle (1938) as Assistant Dubber (uncredited)
 Idiot's Delight (1939) as Ed (uncredited)
 You Can't Get Away with Murder (1939) as Boat Tour Guide (uncredited)
 The Story of Vernon and Irene Castle (1939) as Adjutant (uncredited)
 The Flying Irishman (1939) as New York Mechanic (uncredited)
 Women in the Wind (1939) as Chuck - the Mechanic (uncredited)
 Lucky Night (1939) as Play Palace Announcer (uncredited)
 It's a Wonderful World (1939) as Peters - Stagehand (uncredited)
 Five Came Back (1939) as Photographer (uncredited)
 Waterfront (1939) as Skids Riley
 The Star Maker (1939) as First Reporter
 Thunder Afloat (1939) as Petty Officer (uncredited)
 No Place to Go (1939) as Pete Shafter
 Reno (1939) as J. Hezmer "Hezzy" Briggs
 Nick Carter, Master Detective (1939) as Pete
 Gone with the Wind (1939) as Soldier Aiding Dr. Meade (uncredited)
 Invisible Stripes (1939) as Steve - Henchman on Bank Job (uncredited)
 Married and in Love (1940) as Jim Carter, Man in Bar
 The Grapes of Wrath (1940) as Tim
 The Fighting 69th (1940) as Engineer Sergeant at Cave-In (uncredited)
 Castle on the Hudson (1940) as Guard Who is Slugged (uncredited)
 Millionaire Playboy (1940) (scenes deleted)
 Curtain Call (1940) as Spike Malone
 Saturday's Children (1940) as Cab Driver (uncredited)
 Edison, the Man (1940) as Galbreath (uncredited)
 La Conga Nights (1940) as Jeepers Peepers (uncredited)
 Brother Orchid (1940) as Parkway Biltmore Desk Clerk (uncredited)
 Pop Always Pays (1940) as Minerva Auto Loan Cashier (uncredited)
 They Drive by Night (1940) as Driver in Cafe (uncredited)
 Margie (1940) as Mr. Leffingwell
 No Time for Comedy (1940) as Cab Driver
 City for Conquest (1940) as Band Conductor and Emcee (uncredited)
 East of the River (1940) as Tour Guide (uncredited)
 Blame It on Love (1940) as Studio Electrician
 The Reluctant Dragon (1941) as Frank - Orchestra Leader (uncredited)
 Come Live with Me (1941) as Waiter
 Footsteps in the Dark (1941) as Gus - Taxi Driver (uncredited)
 Knockout (1941) as Fighter in Locker Room (uncredited)
 Model Wife (1941) as Master of Ceremonies (uncredited)
 Thieves Fall Out (1941) as Pick
 Affectionately Yours (1941) as Ambulance Driver (uncredited)
 Blossoms in the Dust (1941) as Man With Man Carrying Dead Child (uncredited)
 Sergeant York (1941) as But! Boy (uncredited)
 Father Steps Out (1941) as Tall Hobo 'King', aka The King of Siam
 International Squadron (1941) as Process Server (uncredited)
 Tanks a Million (1941) as Pvt. Skivic
 Let's Go Collegiate (1941) as Speed Dorman
 Top Sergeant Mulligan (1941) as Pat Dolan
 Unholy Partners (1941) as Roger Ordway (uncredited)
 H. M. Pulham, Esq. (1941) as Marine Sergeant (uncredited)
 Steel Against the Sky (1941) as Egg Man in Diner (uncredited)
 Hay Foot (1942) as Major (uncredited)
 Joe Smith, American (1942) as Man in Waiting Room with Matches (uncredited)
 Dr. Kildare's Victory (1942) as Peter 'Pete' Taylor (uncredited)
 Mokey (1942) as Police Desk Sergeant (uncredited)
 Whispering Ghosts (1942) as Curly the Announcer (uncredited)
 Yankee Doodle Dandy (1942) as Sergeant on Parade - Last Scene (uncredited)
 Maisie Gets Her Man (1942) as Second Stage Manager (uncredited)
 Tough As They Come (1942) as Collector (uncredited)
 The Pride of the Yankees (1942) as Yankee Third Base Coach (uncredited)
 Wings for the Eagle (1942) as Bandleader (uncredited)
 A-Haunting We Will Go (1942) as Train Detective (uncredited)
 Wake Island (1942) as Marine Finding Skipper's Litter (uncredited)
 Somewhere I'll Find You (1942) as Slim, Army Driver (uncredited)
 The Palm Beach Story (1942) as Taxi Driver (uncredited)
 Across the Pacific (1942) as Sidewalk Toy Vendor (uncredited)
 Fall In (1942) as Capt. Gillis
 Star Spangled Rhythm (1942) as Soldier - 'That Old Black Magic' Number (uncredited)
 The McGuerins from Brooklyn (1942) as Crap Table Stickman (uncredited)
 Silver Skates (1943) as Eddie
 Dixie Dugan (1943) as Soldier (uncredited)
 Salute for Three (1943) as Buzz's Soldier Friend (uncredited)
 Prairie Chickens (1943) as Henchman Clem (uncredited)
 Slightly Dangerous (1943) as Gateman (uncredited)
 The Falcon Strikes Back (1943) as Cecil - First Hobo (uncredited)
 Follow the Band (1943) as Brooks (uncredited)
 Taxi, Mister (1943) as Henchman Silk
 Mission to Moscow (1943) as Reporter (uncredited)
 Good Morning, Judge (1943) as Ben Pollard
 Three Hearts for Julia (1943) as Meek Gateman (uncredited)
 Nazty Nuisance (1943) as Seaman Benson
 Get Going (1943) as Hank
 Yanks Ahoy (1943) as Quartermaster Jenkins
 Young Ideas (1943) as Reporter (uncredited)
 The Good Fellows (1943) as Brody (uncredited)
 Thank Your Lucky Stars (1943) as Sailor (uncredited)
 Corvette K-225 (1943) as Shipyard Painter (uncredited)
 The Unknown Guest (1943) as Truck Driver (uncredited)
 Mystery of the 13th Guest (1943) as Speed Dugan aka McGinnis
 She's for Me (1943) as Keys
 The Gang's All Here (1943) as Marine Sergeant (uncredited)
 A Guy Named Joe (1943) as Major (uncredited)
 Tarzan's Desert Mystery (1943) as Achmed (uncredited)
 Standing Room Only (1944) as Cab Driver (uncredited)
 See Here, Private Hargrove (1944) as Military Policeman (uncredited)
 Address Unknown (1944) as Jimmie Blake
 And the Angels Sing (1944) as Holman
 Andy Hardy's Blonde Trouble (1944) as Taxi Driver #2 (uncredited)
 The Canterville Ghost (1944) as Lieutenant Kane
 The National Barn Dance (1944) as Musical Team Member (uncredited)
 An American Romance (1944) as Bartender (uncredited)
 Bring on the Girls! (1945) as Sailor
 Pride of the Marines (1945) as Patient on ward (uncredited)
 The Affairs of Susan (1945) as Brooklyn Boy (uncredited)
 You Came Along (1945) as Bellboy (uncredited)
 Incendiary Blonde (1945) as Hotel Clerk (uncredited)
 Duffy's Tavern (1945) as Customer (uncredited)
 The Lost Weekend (1945) as "Bim" Nolan, the nurse in the alcoholic ward
 Masquerade in Mexico (1945) as Brooklyn (uncredited)
 To Each His Own (1946) as Babe
 Two Years Before the Mast (1946) as Hansen
 The Blue Dahlia (1946) as Man Recommending a Motel
 The Well-Groomed Bride (1946) as Taxi Driver (uncredited)
 Our Hearts Were Growing Up (1946) as Federal Agent
 Blue Skies (1946) as Mack
 Cross My Heart (1946) as Fingerprint Expert (uncredited)
 It's a Wonderful Life (1946) as Ernie Bishop, the cab driver
 California (1947) as Whitey
 Easy Come, Easy Go (1947) as Boss
 Suddenly It's Spring (1947) as Harold Michaels
 Welcome Stranger (1947) as Bill Walters
 The Trouble with Women (1947) as Geeger
 The Perils of Pauline (1947) as Mr. Joe Gurt
 Road to Rio (1947) as Trigger
 Variety Girl (1947) as Himself
 Hazard (1948) as Oscar
 Race Street (1948) as Phil Dickson
 Blood on the Moon (1948) as Jake Pindalest
 Whispering Smith (1948) as Whitey Du Sang, a ruthless, gunslinging, train robbing cowboy
 The Nevadan (1950) as Jeff
 Francis (1950) as Sgt. Chillingbacker
 The Eagle and the Hawk (1950) as Red' Hyatt - Danzeeger's Foreman
 Convicted (1950) as Convict Ponti
 Copper Canyon (1950) as Mullins
 Fourteen Hours (1951) as Room Service Waiter
 Passage West (1951) as Curly
 Detective Story (1951) as Det. Gallagher
 My Favorite Spy (1951) as Newton
 The Sniper (1952) as Police Insp. Anderson
 The Lusty Men (1952) as Al Dawson
 Hangman's Knot (1952) as Cass Browne
 99 River Street (1953) as Stan Hogan
 Red Garters (1954) as Billy Buckett
 Riot in Cell Block 11 (1954) as Commissioner Haskell
 The Lone Gun (1954) as Fairweather
 The Looters (1955) as Stan Leppich
 The McConnell Story (1955) as Sfc. Sykes
 Terror at Midnight (1956) as Fred Hill
 Away All Boats (1956) as Chief Phillip P. 'Pappy' Moran
 Everything but the Truth (1956) as 'Mac' McMillan
 Three Brave Men (1956) as Enos Warren
 7th Cavalry (1957) as Sgt. Kruger
 Gunfight at the O.K. Corral (1957) as Cotton Wilson
 Dino (1957) as Frank Mandel
 Dick Powell's Zane Grey Theatre (1959) as Doc Alvarez 
 North to Alaska (1960) as Arnie (uncredited)
 The Monkey's Uncle (1965) as Mr. Dearborne
 Fluffy (1965) as Catfish
 When the Boys Meet the Girls (1965) as Phin Gray
 The Beverly Hillbillies (1966, TV Series) as Marvin
 Petticoat Junction (1968, TV Series) as Ralph
 Funny Girl (1968) as Keeney
 Quincy, M.E (1978, TV Series) as Janus (final appearance)

References

External links
 
 
 

1905 births
1985 deaths
American male film actors
American male television actors
Deaths from pneumonia in California
Male actors from St. Louis
Vaudeville performers
20th-century American male actors
Burials at San Fernando Mission Cemetery
Western (genre) television actors